Fritz Pettyjohn (born September 20, 1945) is a Republican politician in the U.S. state of Alaska. He was born in Berkeley, California in 1945. He received a BA in Political Science from UC Berkeley in 1967 and a JD from UCLA in 1974. He served in the Naval Reserve Officer Training Corps as a Midshipman from 1962 to 1963. He was elected to the Alaska Senate in 1982 and served for one term. He was elected to the Alaska House of Representatives in 1984 and was subsequently reelected in 1986 and 1988. After leaving the legislature, he wrote biweekly political columns for the Anchorage Daily News. In 2001, he moved back to California. He has been married to his wife for 48 years and he has three sons and five grandchildren.

References

|-

1945 births
Living people
20th-century American politicians
Republican Party Alaska state senators
Republican Party members of the Alaska House of Representatives
UCLA School of Law alumni
University of California, Berkeley alumni